In sports, running out the clock (also known as running down the clock, stonewalling, killing the clock, chewing the clock, stalling, time-wasting (or timewasting) or eating clock) is the practice of a winning team allowing the clock to expire through a series of preselected plays, either to preserve a lead or hasten the end of a one-sided contest. Such measures expend time but do not otherwise have a tactical purpose. This is usually done by a team that is winning by a slim margin (or, occasionally, tied) near the end of a game, in order to reduce the time available for the opposing team to score. Generally, it is the opposite strategy of running up the score.

The process of running out the clock generally involves low-risk, low-event play, intending to minimize the ability of the other team to interfere or counter. As this produces unexciting sport for spectators, many rulebooks attempt to counteract this; some include a time limit for completing a play, such as a play clock or shot clock.

Approaches to running out the clock differ, particularly between sports. In some cases it is considered a normal aspect of the game, whereas in others it is considered unsporting. The term "time-wasting" has pejorative implications and is generally reserved for varieties of football. In other timed sports, including basketball, gridiron football, and hockey, the more neutral term "running out the clock" is more commonly used.

Gridiron football

American football
In American football, each quarter of a game is measured with a 15-minute game clock, or 12-minute clock in many high school football codes and the German Football League. A team in possession of the lead and the ball will attempt to use up as much of the game clock as possible in order to bring the game to an end more quickly, thus denying the opposition another chance on offense.

Typically, the leading team will execute a series of simple rushing plays (the clock does not stop moving at the conclusion of a rushing play unless the rusher steps out of bounds) or one or more quarterback kneels. A team will often accept minimal prospect for a large gain in yardage (or even, particularly with quarterback kneels, a modest loss of yardage) in order to drain more time from the game clock, as time elapsed is considered more valuable than yardage to a team with the lead. Passing plays are not typically used by a team running out the clock, as an incomplete pass will cause the game clock to stop. Passing plays always carry the risk of interception, and spread the offense widely across the field, which makes tackling after an interception much harder compared to a fumble. If the ball passes out of bounds, the clock will also stop. This leads to teams running plays in the middle of the field in order to minimize the chance that the ball will travel out of bounds. Running plays also carry a much lower chance of turning the ball over and of a turnover resulting in a score or significant gain for the defense. Relatively safe, short, West Coast offense-type passes can be, and sometimes are, included in attempts to run out the clock, especially if more yardage is needed to earn a first down and maintain possession.

In both professional and college football, the offense has 40 seconds from the end of the previous play to run the next play. A team running out the clock will allow the play clock (which records the time remaining until a play must be run) to drain as much as possible before running its next play. In the NFL, this is particularly noteworthy due to the existence of the two-minute warning. If the trailing team has no timeouts remaining and the leading team is in possession of the ball with a first down at the two-minute warning, they can effectively run out the clock and win the game without running another positive play. With two minutes to go (120 seconds), the offense can take three "knees", one each on 1st, 2nd, and 3rd down (using all 40 seconds from the play clock on each), and allow the game clock to expire before having to run a play for fourth down. A similar situation can be had by also achieving a first down inside the two-minute warning. This practice is commonly known as the "Victory Formation", as the offense lines up in a tightly-protective "V" formation to minimize the chances of a fumble or other turnover.

Conversely, a team that faces the risk of the other team running out the clock may attempt to force its opponent to score so it can quickly get the ball back. In Super Bowl XLVI, for example, the New England Patriots were ahead of the New York Giants 17–15 with 1:04 left in the fourth quarter. The Giants were at the Patriots' six-yard line, however, the Patriots had only one time-out left. The Giants elected to run out as much time as possible and then kick a relatively short field goal to take a late lead. Had the Giants been successful in this strategy it would have left the Patriots with no timeouts and less than 10 seconds remaining to score. The Patriots thus let Ahmad Bradshaw score a touchdown in hopes of scoring a touchdown of their own before the game's end. Bradshaw, aware of the Patriots' strategy, attempted to stop himself from crossing the goal line but was unsuccessful as his momentum carried him forward. The Patriots then received the ball with 57 seconds remaining, but failed to score, and the Giants won 21–17.

Canadian football
Rule differences between the two codes mean that in Canadian football running out the clock is much more limited. The specific differences are:
 The offensive team is only allowed three downs to advance the ball 10 yards and thereby maintain possession, as opposed to four downs in the American game.
 The play clock runs for only 20 seconds from the time the ball is whistled into play, compared to 40 seconds from the end of the last play in U.S. college football and the NFL.
 Two major changes in game timing occur in the last 3 minutes of each half:
 The clock stops after each play.
 The penalty for "time count" (equivalent to "delay of game" in American football) is loss of down on first or second down, and 10 yards on third down with the down repeated. The referee has the right to penalize repeated third-down time counts during the last 3 minutes with loss of possession.
 Finally, if the game clock runs out during a play, or while the ball is dead, the quarter is extended by one final untimed play.

A Canadian football side on offense with a full set of downs can run just over 40 seconds off the game clock, a third of what is possible in American football. The Canadian Football League is proud of this distinction, with "No Lead Is Safe" being one of the league's catchphrases.

Association football 
Time-wasting in association football consists of two forms, extending the length of stoppages when the ball is out of play, and, while the ball is in play, playing in a way as to keep possession of the ball as long as possible rather than attempting to score. 

Extending the length of stoppages

A common time-wasting tactic is to make substitutions late in the game, lengthening the duration of stoppages while the change is made. Players may also feign injury, kick the ball away, obstruct the taking of a quick free kick by an opposing player, or delay the taking of their own free kicks or throw ins. If the referee considers a delay to be unreasonable, the offending player may be given a yellow card.

When playing at home, there have been some instances where teams have been accused of time-wasting by instructing (or allowing) their ball boys to delay returning the ball to the away team.

These actions should, in theory, be negated by the addition of an equal amount of stoppage time, but teams nevertheless employ these methods.

Maintaining possession

A common tactic often involves carrying the ball into the corner of the field and shielding it from the defender. This will commonly lead to a free kick if the frustrated defender budges the player out of the way, or it can also lead to a throw-in by the defender placing a tackle and managing to legally make contact with the ball so close to the line it often rolls out of play. This can be repeated to continue time-wasting.

Laws of the Game
Both types of time-wasting are generally viewed negatively, though only the former is contrary to the game's rules. Referees are empowered to book players whom they feel are delaying the restart of play and several amendments to the Laws of the Game and guidance to match officials have been made to prevent time-wasting, including progressively stricter restrictions on how long possession can be maintained by goalkeepers. The back-pass rule was introduced in 1992 in order to prevent time-wasting by defenders repeatedly passing the ball back to their goalkeeper.

An amendment to the Laws attempting to mitigate time-wasting substitutions was made in 2019 — players are now required to leave the pitch at the nearest boundary, rather than making an often long and slow walk back to their teams' technical area.

Australian rules football 
In a close game, Australian rules football players on the leading side will typically run the clock down by kicking the ball between the defenders while having no intention of a forward thrust, or by advancing the ball with short, low-risk kicks. Each time a mark is taken, the player can run approximately eight seconds off the clock before being required to play on – and may continue to run time off the clock if no opponents pressure them after the call of play on is made. Strategically, running down the clock can be stifled by playing man-on-man defence, in an attempt to force the opposition to kick to a contest, creating the chance for a turnover.

Late in a close game, players who have marked the ball will often attend to their uniforms by performing actions such as tucking in jerseys or pulling their socks up, along with overzealous stretching, in an effort to "milk" the clock and disguise their intentions as an act of plausible deniability. Players kicking for goal are now given a shot clock 30 seconds to take their kicks, while in general play they are only given 7 seconds, after which "play on" is called. According to the laws, wasting time is either (a) a free kick to the opposing team (15.10.1.a), (b) a 50-metre penalty (18.1.b), or (c) a reportable offence if it is judged to be intentional, reckless or negligent (19.2.2.g.iv). In reality, though, the umpire will almost always call play on—even if the time on the 30-second shot clock has been depleted. Shot clocks are disregarded for kicks after the siren.

It is also important to mention that Australian rules football has a scoring concept known as "rushing a behind". A rushed behind scores one point for the attacking team, but it also prevents the attacking team from scoring a goal, worth six points. As such, it is common for a defending player to deliberately concede a single point. However, while such a tactic was accepted in general play as being part of the game, the tactic was exploited to an extreme degree in two high-profile incidents during the 2008 AFL season to take valuable time off the clock and deny the trailing team any chance of winning. In Round 16, Richmond's Joel Bowden rushed two behinds in a row while kicking in to use up time towards the end of their game against Essendon, reducing the margin from 6 points to 4 points but enabling Richmond to win the game. This tactic was exploited to an absurd degree in the 2008 AFL Grand Final, which saw Hawthorn rush a record 11 behinds against Geelong.

Since 2009, it has been illegal in AFL matches for a defender to deliberately concede a rushed behind when he is not under any pressure from the attacking team. In the event that a defender does this, the umpire awards a free kick to the attacking team on the goal-line at the spot where the defender conceded the score. The defender may still deliberately concede a rushed behind if he is under pressure from an attacker.

Rugby union
In rugby union, it often takes place by one team deliberately collapsing a scrum. The penalty is a free kick, as it is considered a technical offence.

Rugby league
In the National Rugby League (rugby league), anti-time wasting measures include countdown clocks to achieve timely formations of the scrum and execution of line drop-outs, calling of time-off during the last five minutes of the match when a try has been scored, or when a conversion attempt runs longer than 80 seconds.

Basketball 
In basketball game clock stops when the ball is dead and runs when it is live.

Running out the clock was a major problem in the early days of the NBA. Ofttimes, once a team grabbed the lead, they would spend the remainder of the game just passing the ball back and forth, in what was called stall ball. The only hope for the other team was to commit fouls and to score on free throws. The worst example was a 1950 game with a final score of 19-18. Another game the same year had six overtime periods with only a single shot attempted in each.

The NBA responded to these problems when Danny Biasone invented the shot clock. The shot clock gives teams 24 seconds (30 seconds in NCAA) to make a shot that hits the basket rim or scores, with the team losing possession if it fails to do so. This effectively eliminated stall ball and in the NBA's own words, "Biasone's invention rescue[d] the league." Today, shot clocks are used in nearly all basketball leagues.

Most clock management in modern basketball centers around both the game clock and the shot clock. An offense nearing the end of a game and holding a slim lead will attempt to use up as much of both clocks as possible before shooting the ball, to give the opposing team as little time as possible to respond.

A team trailing by a small margin near the end of regulation or overtime may counter their opponent's attempt to run out the clock by intentionally committing personal fouls while on defense. This stops the clock, and if the fouling team is in the penalty situation, it forces the fouled team to shoot free throws (usually two). The fouling team will regain possession without any additional clock time lost if the last free throw is successful or if they get the rebound from a missed last free throw, but this strategy carries the obvious risk of giving the fouled team an opportunity to extend its lead if it makes the free throw(s). Fouls intentionally committed in this way are usually tolerated with no penalty beyond the normal penalties assessed for personal fouls, as long as the fouls are not flagrant.

The use of the shot clock in high school basketball can vary by state or league, and stall ball is able to be used as an offensive strategy if specific circumstances call for it, though some state athletic associations or game referees can prohibit it as an unsportsmanlike act throughout an entire quarter or game.

Other sports 

Lacrosse
A team must advance the ball from its defensive square to the midfield line within 20 seconds and then into the offensive square within 10 additional seconds or lose possession; additionally, a team in possession that appears to be stonewalling by not attacking the goal may be ordered by the referee to stay within the attacking box or lose possession. Additionally, the Premier Lacrosse League and most forms of indoor lacrosse employ a shot clock as with basketball.
Ice hockey
A team which shoots the puck forward from their half of the ice over the opposing team's goal line in an effort to stonewall is guilty of icing, and the puck is brought to the other end of the ice for a face-off. The rule is not in effect when a team is playing shorthanded due to a penalty. Additionally, a player (usually a goalkeeper) may be charged with a minor (two-minute) penalty for delay of game for shooting the puck over the glass and out of play. A leading team may pass the puck to the defense who will then retreat in his zone. During a power play, the shorthanded team will try to ice the puck in order to gain time until the penalty time ends.

Water polo
A 30-second shot clock is employed, in much the same manner as college basketball.

See also 
 Garbage time
 Delay of game
 Mercy rule

References

Terminology used in multiple sports
American football terminology